Intense Tropical Cyclone Gombe was a strong tropical cyclone that affected Mozambique. It became the first storm to make a major landfall in Nampula Province in Mozambique since Cyclone Jokwe in 2008. The eighth tropical storm, fourth tropical cyclone and fourth intense tropical cyclone of the 2021–22 South-West Indian Ocean cyclone season, Gombe originated from a tropical disturbance located off the coast of Madagascar. This area of convection was designated by the Joint Typhoon Warning Center as Invest 97S on 6 March. The next day, it began to slowly move westward and executed a loop as it became more organized, which prompted Météo-France Reunion (MFR) to note the system as Zone of Disturbed Weather 09. The system became a depression on 9 March, and became a moderate tropical storm the same day. Soon after being named, Gombe made landfall in Madagascar, and entered in the Mozambique Channel the next day. The storm continued its westward motion while slowly intensifying, and was upgraded to a Tropical Cyclone by the MFR on 10 March. The storm proceeded to make landfall, and quickly lost its convection over land. On 12 March, Gombe degenerated into a remnant low overland. However, the system subsequently turned southeastward and reemerged over water, before briefly regenerating into a tropical depression on 17 March. Gombe dissipated later that day.

Cyclone Gombe killed 72 people across three countries: 63 in Mozambique, 7 in Malawi, and 2 in Madagascar. Tens of thousands of homes were heavily damaged by the storm in Mozambique, and left hundreds of thousands of families without power across Nampula. Gombe affected thousands of hectares of crops, dropped 200 mm (8 in) of rain in 24 hours. The Island of Mozambique also experienced some damage from the storm.

Meteorological history

Cyclone Gombe originated from a zone of disturbed weather that the Météo-France on Réunion (MFR) noted on 6 March, located about 280 nmi (518 km; 322 mi) from Mauritius, moving northeast slowly. The system organized its circulation and became active convectively, which prompted the Joint Typhoon Warning Center (JTWC) to designate the system as Invest 97S hours later, and at 11:40 UTC, issued a Tropical Cyclone Formation Alert (TCFA), noting warm sea surface temperatures of  along with low wind shear. As it executed a counterclockwise loop, the MFR upgraded the storm to a tropical depression at noon on 7 March, and upgraded it to a moderate tropical storm; the Mauritius Meteorological Services named it Gombe. The JTWC followed suit, and classified it as Tropical Cyclone 19S at 18:00 UTC that day.

On 8 March, Gombe made landfall in the Sava Region of Madagascar, and the MFR downgraded the system to an overland depression at 06:00 UTC while it crossed the country, and the JTWC downgraded it to a tropical depression as well. 24 hours later, the system reached the Mozambique Channel, moving westward at 7 kn (12 km/h; 8 mph), and the MFR upgraded it back to a tropical storm at 06:00 UTC on 9 March, with 10-minute sustained winds of 45 kn (83 km/h; 50 mph). Gombe, driven by a subtropical ridge south of the Channel, continued to move westward, and the MFR observed an improved cloud pattern, upgrading it to a Tropical Cyclone at 06:00 UTC on 10 March, estimating maximum 10-minute sustained winds of 65 kn (120 km/h; 75 mph). Gombe then began a period rapid intensification, and the MFR upgraded the storm to Intense Tropical Cyclone, with peak 10-minute sustained winds of 90 kn (166 km/h; 105 mph), and a minimum central pressure of 960 hPa (28.34 inHg) midnight on 11 March. At the same time, the JTWC estimated peak 1-minute sustained winds of 100 kn (185 km/h, 115 mph), which made it a Category 3 cyclone on the Saffir-Simpson scale - the storm strengthened approximately 35 kn (65 km/h; 40 mph) within 18 hours.

The storm made landfall in Nampula Province of Mozambique, the first major cyclone to do so since Cyclone Jokwe of 2008, and subsequently weakened significantly. The MFR downgraded the storm to an Overland Depression for the second time on 06:00 UTC the same day, with the JTWC tagging the system as a high-end Category 1-equivalent. The storm continued to move inland into Mozambique, and the MFR issued their last advisory on Gombe a day later, and the JTWC issued their final advisory at 18:00 UTC on 12 March.
In the advisory released on 17 March by the MFR, what was left of Gombe reorganized itself into a tropical depression as its entered Mozambique channel. However, later that same day, the MFR issued their final advisory on Gombe.

Preparations

Mozambique 
Red warnings were issued for Nampula and Zambezia provinces as the storm neared. Several establishments and institutions were closed prior to the storms arrival. Storm surge of 1–2 meters was forecasted along the coast, with the highest rainfall accumulations being over 600 mm (2 ft). CARE International prepared response efforts with the National Institute for Disaster Management. Approximately 55,000 people were exposed to fluvial flooding.

Impact

Mozambique
The storm made landfall near where Tropical Storm Ana had struck only six weeks prior, which worsened the storm's lasting effects. Several districts remained inaccessible for days after Gombe.

In Nampula Province, heavy winds uprooted trees and ripped roofs off of various public buildings. Electricity and mobile phone services were disrupted, which made communication in impact areas difficult. In Zambezia Province, the bridge connecting the administrative posts of Mulela and Nabur to the village of Pebane collapsed. This left 32,000 people isolated from the posts, and caused scarcities in sanitation, food, and water. In a preliminary satellite estimate, about 3,180 hectares of land were flooded.

Across the country, at least 500,000 people have been affected by Gombe. A total of 45,079 houses have been completely destroyed, two bridges collapsed, and 41 health units were severely affected. 691 classrooms in 301 schools have been damaged in the country, affecting over 75,607 students and 1,221 teachers. More than 300,000 families within 20 districts of Nampula province experienced power outages. On the Island of Mozambique, six people died and several centuries-old trees were uprooted. Some roads were completely stripped away by the storm. Gombe affected around 7,000 people on the island, and impacted 5,500 houses. 100 classrooms were damaged there, affecting 13,000 pupils, and flooded 2,800 hectares of crops. Quelimane received  of rainfall within 24 hours.

Preliminary data stated that around 1,600 temporary relief shelters set up for the aftermath of Gombe were damaged, some blown away and destroyed, with the majority left in need of repair. The cyclone left over 23,994 people displaced, and severely damaged 2,741 electric poles, and 707 km (440 mi) of roads. Nationwide, 736,015 people were directly affected by Cyclone Gombe; 63 people died and 108 suffered injuries.

Elsewhere 
In Malawi, heavy rain and infrastructure damage was reported. At least 7 people have died in the country; with one in the Mangochi District being a 28-year-old man who was washed away by a flooding river. The cyclone reportedly caused "heavy damage" in 10 districts, mostly in the southern portions of the country. A police station, an immigration office, and other buildings were submerged in floodwaters in Mulanje District, with cut-off roads in other areas hampering communication and rescue efforts.

In Madagascar, at least two people died and one person reported missing.

Aftermath

Mozambique 
39 centers for 23,994 displaced people were opened by the National Institute for Disaster Risk Reduction and Management, and about 360 tons of essential items were distributed right after the storm passed. These centers were built with Adobe, which cannot withstand heavy rains. Health care workers reported increased cases of malaria and waterborne diseases amongst those affected. The storm also greatly affected those impacted by the ongoing humanitarian crisis in the northern section of the country, and immediate resources could only support an estimated 100,000 people.

See also 

 Weather of 2022
 Tropical cyclones in 2022
 List of South-West Indian Ocean intense tropical cyclones
Cyclone Jokwe - Affected the same area in Mozambique with a similar intensity
Cyclone Idai – the second deadliest tropical cyclone recorded In the Southern Hemisphere
Cyclone Eloise
Tropical Storm Ana (2022) - Had a similar track to Gombe

Notes

References

External links

MFR Track Data of Intense Tropical Cyclone Gombe 
JTWC Best Track Data of Tropical Cyclone 19S (Gombe)
19S.GOMBE from the United States Naval Research Laboratory

2021–22 South-West Indian Ocean cyclone season
Cyclones in Madagascar
Cyclones in Malawi
Cyclones in Mozambique
2022 in Madagascar
2022 in Malawi
2022 in Mozambique
Storm
Intense Tropical Cyclones
Tropical cyclones in 2022